Patrick Gonin (born 23 May 1957) is a retired French racing driver.

Patrick Gonin began his career in 1980 with an eighth place overall in the French Formula Renault Championship. In 1982, he entered the French Formula Three Championship, where he finished fourth in the championship behind Pierre Petit, Michel Ferté and François Hesnault.

References

1957 births
Living people
French racing drivers
24 Hours of Le Mans drivers

Team LeMans drivers